Iso-Syöte is the southernmost fell in Finland, adjacent to the Syöte National Park that is named after the fell. The blanket of snow covering the trees and landscape transforms nature into a fairy tale land. Travelling resort consists of two fells and skiing centers, namely Iso-Syöte and Pikku-Syöte.

References

Pudasjärvi
Mountains of Finland
Ski areas and resorts in Finland
Landforms of North Ostrobothnia